Dry Bones may refer to:

The Vision of the Valley of Dry Bones, in the Book of Ezekiel
"Dem Bones", a traditional song based on Ezekiel 37:14
"Dry Bones" (folk song)
 Dry Bones (comic strip), a political cartoon published in The Jerusalem Post, 1973-
"Dry Bones", a short story by William Sanders
 Dry Bones, the band that later changed their name to Everdown and signed to Solid State Records
Dry Bones (character), a recurring enemy character from the Super Mario series